Turell or Turèll is the surname of the following people: 
Dan Turèll (1946–1993), Danish writer
Jane Colman Turell (1708–1735), American colonial poet
Ryan Turell (born 1999), American professional basketball player
Samuel Turell Armstrong (1784–1850), American political figure
Saul J. Turell (1921–1986), American producer and maker of documentaries

See also
Turrell (name)